The 2005 Speaker of the Lebanese Parliament election was the 4th legislative speaker election since the implementation of the Taif Agreement, held on 28 June 2005 during the first session of the 23rd parliament. The incumbent Speaker Nabih Berri and head of the Amal Movement was re-elected to a fourth term.

Under the article 44 of the constitution, the speaker is elected at the start of each parliamentary cycle by an absolute majority of the deputies' vote. By convention, he is always a Shia Muslim.

Berri won the majority of the votes cast, receiving 90 votes and 70.3% out of 128 deputies.

Vote

References 

Lebanese legislative speaker elections
2005 in Lebanon
Nabih Berri